Talala (Gir) is a city and a taluka in Gir Somnath district in the Gujarat state of India, also known as capital of Gir.

Talala, 75 km from Junagadh, is famous for Asiatic lions and its huge orchards of Kesar mangoes. Earlier Talala (Gir) was part of Junagadh district, but now it comes under Gir Somnath District.

Places

APMC Market Yard Talala (Gir) 
APMC Talala (Gir) was established on 6 June 1987, it started its operation in 1991. Total construction cost of APMC was around 2,19,84,984 which includes building of shops, road, godown, compound wall, office. Auction of kesar mango in APMC started on 29 April 2000.

Sri Bai Ashram 
Sri Bai Ashram is located on the bank of Hiran River. It is a historic temple of Sri Bai.

Hadmatiya Stupa
Buddhist Stupa, belonging to the era of Kshatrapas (built in the 2nd century), locally known as Vajir Panat No Kotho is in the forest three kilometres away from the village Hadmatiya of Talala Taluka. It is located on the bank of the Sarasvati river. The outer part of the Stupa was built about the start of the Common Era which is built by burnt bricks. The inner part is filled with undressed stones.

Villages 
Villages under Talala (Gir) are Ankolvadi, Abudi, Alavani, Amblash, Amrutvel, Anida, Bakula Dhanej, Bamanasa, Batheshvar, Bhagatimbi, Bhalchhel, Bhantha, Bheriya, Bhimdeval, Bhojde, Bhuvatirath, Boravav, Chhodiya, Chitravad, Chitrod, Chopatla, Dayara Timbi, Dedkadi, Devaliya, Dhava, Dhramanva, Dudhala, Gabha, Gadhula, Galiyawad, Ghunsiya, Gola, Gundaran, Hadmatiya, Haripur, Hiranvel, Jamalpara, Jambuthala, Janvadla, Jasadhar, Jasapur, Javantri, Jepur, Junvaniya, Kadali, Kadvali, Kamleshwar, Kansiya, Kapuriya, Karamdadi, Karamnadajiya, Kathital, Kerambha, Khada, Khakhravala, Kheriyavala, Khirdhar, Khodiyar, Kiloriya, Kisa, Kutiya, Lakadverines, Lushala, Madhupur Jambur, Maljhinjhva, Mandorna, Moruka, Nana Bhilgala, Nanava, Nima, Pancholi, Patariya, Patasala, Pikhor, Pipalva, Piparda, Ramarechi, Rampara, Rasulpura, Ratidhar, Ravta, Raydi, Raydi, Sajiya, Sandhbeda, Sangodra, Semaliya, Semarvav, Shirvan, Somanisar, Surva, Talala (M), Umrethi, Vadala, Vadla, Vadvangada, Vansali, Virpur, Vithalpur

Transport
Talala (Gir) junction for western railways and is served by daily train connect to cities in Gujarat such as Veraval, Bhavanagar, Junagadh, Rajkot and Ahmedabad. And also connected  Una Kodinar

the nearest airport are Diu & Rajkot and daily connect to Mumbai

state transport bus is also there to connect daily with Gandhinagar(Capital City) Ahmedabad Rajkot Jamnagar junagadh veraval also connected  Una Kodinar

https://www.mygujarat1.com/rajkot-market-yard-na-aaj-na-bhav

Villages in Gir Somnath district
Cities and towns in Gir Somnath district